Illinois Exempt Veterans' Organizations from Property Taxes Amendment may refer to:

 Illinois Exempt Veterans' Organizations from Property Taxes Amendment (1978)
 Illinois Exempt Veterans' Organizations from Property Taxes Amendment (1984)
 Illinois Exempt Veterans' Organizations from Property Taxes Amendment (1986)